Ormston may refer to:
Alexander Ormston, English footballer
Arthur Ormston, English footballer
Dean Ormston, British comic artist
Jack Ormston, British racer
Richard Ormston, British theologian
William Ormston, British cyclist
William Ormston Backhouse, English agriculturist